Christopher or Chris Knight may refer to:

Film and television
Christopher Knight (actor) (born 1957), American actor
Christopher Knight (filmmaker), blogger and filmmaker
Chris Knight (Neighbours), fictional character in the soap opera Neighbours, portrayed by Luke Mitchell
Chris Knight, the protagonist in the motion picture Real Genius

Music
Chris Knight (musician) (born 1960), American country music singer and songwriter
Chris Knight (album), his self-titled debut album

Writing
Chris Knight (anthropologist), author of several books on human origins and evolutionary linguistics; founding member of the Radical Anthropology Group
Christopher Knight (author), author of several books examining archaeoastronomy, stone monuments and megaliths, and Freemasonry
Christopher Knight, the pseudonym used by author Christopher Wright
Chris W. Knight, author of the autobiography Son of Scarface

Other uses
Christopher Knight (art critic), American art critic
Christopher Knight (cricketer) (born 1972), former English cricketer
Christopher Thomas Knight (born 1965), "North Pond Hermit"
Chris Knight (anthropologist) (born 1942), founding member of the Radical Anthropology Group
Chris Knight (rugby union) (born 1991), Welsh rugby player

See also
Christopher Knights, English voice actor
Chris Knights (born 1986), Australian football player